Ben Itzhak, Ben-Itzhak or Ben Itzhok is a Jewish surname literally meaning "son of Itzhak". Notable people with the surname include:

Gonen Ben Itzhak, Israeli lawyer
Itzik Ben-Itzhak, American professor of physics
Yuval Ben-Itzhak, American executive and entrepreneur

Fictional characters
Yankele ben Itzhok, the sidekick of The King of Schnorrers

See also

Hebrew-language surnames